Clothar the Frank is a Canadian historical fiction novel by Jack Whyte that continues his Arthurian Cycle as told in A Dream of Eagles series of novels (called The Camulod Chronicles outside of Canada).  Outside of Canada, the novel has the title The Lance Thrower and is edited differently from the Canadian version.

The novel is the first in a two-part continuation after the events in A Dream Of Eagles.  The story is narrated by Clothar (Lancelot) and describes his early life in Roman Gaul, his education in Auxerre with Bishop Germanus, his participation in a civil war and his travels to Britain where he meets Caius Merlyn Britaniccus (Merlin) and King Arthur for the first time.

Canadian fantasy novels
Canadian historical novels
Novels by Jack Whyte
Novels set in Roman Gaul
Novels set in sub-Roman Britain
Modern Arthurian fiction
2003 British novels
Viking Press books